Ibtisam al-Mutawakkil (born 1970) is a Yemeni poet born in Sana'a. She is best known for her 1998 poetry collection Shadha al-jamr (The Scent of Embers).

References

Yemeni women poets
1970 births
Living people
People from Sanaa